Rivière-Saint-Jean is a municipality and village in the Côte-Nord region of the province of Quebec in Canada.

In addition to the village of Rivière-Saint-Jean, the municipality also includes the community of Magpie which is located near the mouth of the Magpie River.

Demographics

Population

Language

See also
 List of municipalities in Quebec

References 

Municipalities in Quebec
Incorporated places in Côte-Nord